The 2006 U.S. Figure Skating Championships took place between January 7 and 15, 2006 at the Savvis Center in St. Louis, Missouri. Skaters competed in four disciplines – men's singles, ladies' singles, pair skating, and ice dancing – across three levels: senior, junior, and novice. Medals were awarded in four colors: gold (first), silver (second), bronze (third), and pewter (fourth).

The event was used to determine the U.S. teams for the 2006 Winter Olympics, the 2006 World Championships, the 2006 Four Continents Championships, and the 2006 World Junior Championships.

Competition notes
 This was the first time the ISU Judging System was used at the U.S. Championships.
 Novice ice dancing teams Madison Hubbell / Keiffer Hubbell and Cathy Reed / Chris Reed tied in the first novice compulsory dance. The tie was broken by the technical elements score and so the Hubbells won that segment of the competition.
 Junior men's silver medalist Jonathan Trinh was not placed on the World Junior Championships team because he was not age-eligible.

Senior results

Men

Ladies

Pairs

Ice dancing

Junior results

Men

Ladies

Pairs

Ice dancing

Novice results

Men

Ladies

Pairs

Ice dancing

International team selections

Winter Olympic

World Championships

Four Continents Championships

World Junior Championships

References

External links
 
 senior results
 junior results
 novice results
 Official Homepage

United States Figure Skating Championships, 2006
United States Figure Skating Championships, 2006
U.S. Figure Skating Championships
January 2006 sports events in the United States